Pontblyddyn is a small village outside Leeswood, in Flintshire, Wales and is situated around 8 miles from Wrexham. Plas Teg, one of the most important Jacobean era houses in Wales, is located near the village.

References

Villages in Flintshire